Tremont City is a village in Clark County, Ohio, United States. The population was 375 at the 2010 census. The village is part of the Springfield, Ohio Metropolitan Statistical Area.

History
Tremont City was originally known at Treemount because the settlement was situated at the base of a hill covered with large trees. A post office called Tremont was established in 1839, and the name was changed to Tremont City in 1877.

Known for its annual car show.

Geography
Tremont City is located at  (40.013759, -83.835165).

Demographics

2010 census
As of the census of 2010, there were 375 people, 151 households, and 99 families living in the village. The racial makeup of the village was 98.9% White, 0.3% African American, 0.3% Asian, 0.3% from other races, and 0.3% from two or more races. Hispanic or Latino of any race were 1.6% of the population.

There were 151 households, of which 31.1% had children under the age of 18 living with them, 43.0% were married couples living together, 17.2% had a female householder with no husband present, 5.3% had a male householder with no wife present, and 34.4% were non-families. 28.5% of all households were made up of individuals, and 6.6% had someone living alone who was 65 years of age or older. The average household size was 2.48 and the average family size was 2.99.

The median age in the village was 39.4 years. 20.8% of residents were under the age of 18; 12.6% were between the ages of 18 and 24; 25.3% were from 25 to 44; 30.4% were from 45 to 64; and 10.9% were 65 years of age or older. The gender makeup of the village was 52.0% male and 48.0% female.

2000 census
As of the census of 2000, there were 349 people, 134 households, and 95 families living in the village. The population density was 1,306.5 people per square mile (499.1/km). There were 138 housing units at an average density of 516.6 per square mile (197.3/km). The racial makeup of the village was 97.42% White, 1.15% African American, 0.57% Native American, and 0.86% from two or more races. Hispanic or Latino of any race were 0.57% of the population.

There were 134 households, out of which 41.0% had children under the age of 18 living with them, 50.7% were married couples living together, 13.4% had a female householder with no husband present, and 28.4% were non-families. 24.6% of all households were made up of individuals, and 3.0% had someone living alone who was 65 years of age or older. The average household size was 2.60 and the average family size was 3.10.

In the village, the population was spread out, with 29.8% under the age of 18, 8.6% from 18 to 24, 34.4% from 25 to 44, 19.8% from 45 to 64, and 7.4% who were 65 years of age or older. The median age was 32 years. For every 100 females there were 93.9 males. For every 100 females age 18 and over, there were 97.6 males.

The median income for a household in the village was $50,000, and the median income for a family was $51,250. Males had a median income of $33,958 versus $26,875 for females. The per capita income for the village was $19,139. About 7.5% of families and 5.8% of the population were below the poverty line, including 3.2% of those under age 18 and 20.0% of those age 65 or over.

Transportation
Mad River Airport, a private airport, located one mile northeast of the city.

References

Villages in Clark County, Ohio
Villages in Ohio
1839 establishments in Ohio
Populated places established in 1839